Altimir Glacier is a  long and  wide glacier draining the north slopes of the Osterrieth Range on Anvers Island in the Palmer Archipelago, Antarctica. It flows northwards to enter Dalchev Cove in Fournier Bay east of Studena Point.

The glacier is named after the settlement of Altimir in northwestern Bulgaria.

Location
It was mapped by the British Directorate of Overseas Surveys in 1980.

See also
 List of glaciers in the Antarctic
 Glaciology

Maps
 British Antarctic Territory. Scale 1:200000 topographic map No. 3217. DOS 610 - W 64 62. Tolworth, UK, 1980.
 Antarctic Digital Database (ADD). Scale 1:250000 topographic map of Antarctica. Scientific Committee on Antarctic Research (SCAR), 1993–2016.

References

Bibliography 
 Altimir Glacier. SCAR Composite Gazetteer of Antarctica.
 Bulgarian Antarctic Gazetteer. Antarctic Place-names Commission. (details in Bulgarian, basic data in English)

External links
 Altimir Glacier. Copernix satellite image

Glaciers of the Palmer Archipelago
Bulgaria and the Antarctic
Geography of Anvers Island